Umera or Ümera may refer to
Battle of Ümera  between Livonian Crusaders and Estonians in 1210
Ümera jõel, a 1934 novel by Mait Metsanurk
Umera Ahmad (born 1976), Pakistani author and screenwriter